Kenneth Julius Fontenette, Jr. (born January 14, 1986) is an American football defensive back who is currently a free agent. He was signed by the Kansas City Command as an undrafted free agent in 2011. He played college football at University of Houston.

References

External links
Houston Cougars bio
Arena Football League bio

1986 births
Living people
American football defensive backs
Houston Cougars football players
Arkansas Diamonds players
Kansas City Command players
San Antonio Talons players
San Jose SaberCats players